Rhapidophyllum hystrix, the needle palm, is a palm, the sole member of the genus Rhapidophyllum. It is native to coastal margins of the subtropical eastern Gulf and south Atlantic states of the United States. Endemic populations can be found from coastal southeast South Carolina, southward to Florida and west across the coastal plain of Mississippi and southern Alabama. It is one of the most cold-hardy palms in the world, and can be found growing in several areas with warm temperate climates.

The flowers are borne in dense, short clusters at the top of the stems; it is usually dioecious with male and female flowers on separate plants.

The scientific name Rhapidophyllum means "needle-leaf", while hystrix is from the scientific name of a genus of porcupines. The English name likewise refers to the needle-like spines produced at the petiole bases; for similar reasons, it is also occasionally called "porcupine palm".

Cultivation and uses

The needle palm is very popular among palm enthusiasts in temperate climates for its ability to tolerate modest cold. Recovery of winter damage of needle palms is much more precarious in climates with cool summers like the Pacific NW (USA/Canada), NW Europe.

In the United States, needle palms are cultivated north along the East Coast to Long Island Sound, and along the West Coast of the US as far north as Seattle, Washington. Large, well-established specimens have been growing in Tennessee, the southern Ohio Valley, and Washington, DC at the United States National Arboretum since the 1960s, and more recently in the coastal NYC area at the Brooklyn Botanic Gardens. It is becoming one of the most popular landscaping palms in the Chesapeake Bay area of Maryland. Needle palms need hot summers to thrive and the species does not grow well in the cool summer climates mentioned above.

The needle palm is considered to be commercially exploited and therefore threatened. When purchasing this palm, it is wise to purchase it only from a reputable dealer, as some unscrupulous dealers harvest them directly from the wild.

References

External links
Scanpalm Rhapidophyllum
Rhapidophyllum hystrix - Needle Palm Tree
Palm & Cycad Societies of Florida: Photos of wild and cultivated specimens
Plant Delights Nursery

Coryphoideae
Flora of the Southeastern United States
Monotypic Arecaceae genera
Taxa named by Carl Georg Oscar Drude
Taxa named by Hermann Wendland